Materials and Structures is a peer-reviewed scientific journal published by Springer Science+Business Media on behalf of RILEM (the International Union of Laboratories and Experts in Construction Materials, Systems and Structures). It covers research on fundamental properties of building materials, their characterization and processing techniques, modeling, standardization of test methods, and the application of research results in building and civil engineering. Materials and Structures also publishes comprehensive reports prepared by RILEM Technical Committees. The current editor-in-chief is John Provis (University of Sheffield).

Abstracting and indexing
The journal is abstracted and indexed in: 

According to the Journal Citation Reports, the journal has a 2020 impact factor of 3.428.

References

External links 
 
RILEM - The International Union of Laboratories and Experts in Construction Materials, Systems and Structures 

English-language journals
Engineering journals
Materials science journals
Publications established in 1968
Springer Science+Business Media academic journals
Monthly journals